Events in the year 1618 in Norway.

Incumbents
Monarch: Christian IV

Events
Jens Juel was appointed Governor-General of Norway.
Det Norske Jernkompani (The Norwegian Iron Company) was established.

Arts and literature

Births

Deaths

See also

References